Clydie Roberts (born 7 July 1987) is an English-born Guyanese footballer who plays as a midfielder for Brentwood Town, and has been capped internationally for the Guyana national football team. He has spent his entire career playing non-League football.

Career

Club career
Roberts started his career with Redbridge progressing through their youth system into the first-team. He went on to have a short spell with Thurrock before moving onto Canvey Island, where he was voted 'Player's Player of the Year' for the 2006–07 season where he made 44 appearances, scoring three goals. He helped them gain promotion from Isthmian League Division One North to Isthmian League Premier Division. Roberts then had a trial with AFC Wimbledon in July 2007, but was not offered a contract by manager Terry Brown.

In July 2008, Roberts had an unsuccessful trial with League Two club Bournemouth. He joined Potters Bar Town in late 2008 from Harlow Town. He made his debut for Potters Bar Town, in the 1–0 away win over Waltham Forest in November 2008 alongside Ryan Edgar. Roberts left the club in January 2009 and signed for Waltham Forest. Later in January, he joined Waltham Forest's Isthmian League Division One North league rivals Enfield Town.

He went on to join Aveley, then Concord Rangers in December 2009, before signing for Grays Athletic in October 2010, where he made two appearances in the Isthmian League Division One North. Roberts went on to join Ilford, where he made nine league appearances. He went on to join Brentwood Town at the start of the 2011–12 season.

International career
Roberts gained two caps for Guyana in 2008. He made his debut in a home friendly against Cuba in the 0–0 draw on 22 February, and his second cap in the 2–1 win against Cuba on 24 February, alongside his Canvey Island teammate Chris Bourne.

Personal life
Roberts is cousin to professional footballer and England international, Jermain Defoe.

References

External links

Living people
English footballers
Guyanese footballers
Guyana international footballers
Redbridge F.C. players
Thurrock F.C. players
Canvey Island F.C. players
Potters Bar Town F.C. players
Harlow Town F.C. players
Waltham Forest F.C. players
Enfield Town F.C. players
Aveley F.C. players
Concord Rangers F.C. players
Grays Athletic F.C. players
Ilford F.C. players
Brentwood Town F.C. players
Isthmian League players
1987 births
Association football midfielders
English people of Guyanese descent